Tansel Başer (born 17 April 1978 in Melbourne, Victoria, Australia) is a former Australian-Turkish footballer.

References

External links
 

1978 births
Australian people of Turkish descent
South Melbourne FC players
Trabzonspor footballers
Vanspor footballers
Akçaabat Sebatspor footballers
Erzurumspor footballers
Hume City FC players
Süper Lig players
National Soccer League (Australia) players
Soccer players from Melbourne
Australian expatriate soccer players
Expatriate footballers in Turkey
Living people
Association football defenders
Australian soccer players
Australian expatriate sportspeople in Turkey